The Kühlstein Wagenbau in Berlin-Charlottenburg was a coachbuilding company that produced electric cars from 1898 to 1902. Some were vehicles of in-house design, others were Jeantaud cabs built under licence. The firm also built tractor units to replace horses for use with horse-drawn carriages. Later models were also known as Kühlstein-Vollmer. Production of these vehicles was absorbed by the Neue Automobil Gesellschaft (NAG) in 1902. Kühlstein continued manufacturing coachworks, e.g. for Horch cars.

Defunct motor vehicle manufacturers of Germany
Coachbuilders of Germany